David Weeks (born October 30, 1968) is an American designer of lighting, furniture, and household products.

Early life
Originally from Athens, Georgia, Weeks studied painting and sculpture at the Rhode Island School of Design, where he earned a BFA. He went on to work in the Manhattan studio of Ted Muehling before founding David Weeks Studio. Weeks was an adjunct professor at Parsons School of Design from 1998-2006, and in 2002 a visiting critic at Yale.

David Weeks Studio
Weeks founded New York-based David Weeks Studio in 1996. The studio produces lighting and furniture for commercial and residential uses; its recent product lines include: Sculpt, an upholstered collection; Sarus, a lighting collection for Ralph Pucci; updated Semana chairs for Habitat UK; and new consumer products for Areaware and Kikkerland.

The Studio also creates custom lighting, furniture, sculpture, and interiors. Commissioned projects include Barneys New York, Kate Spade, Saks Fifth Avenue, MGM Grand Las Vegas, Hard Rock Hotel Las Vegas, and Bliss Spa.

David Weeks Studio lighting is featured in the apartment of Serena van der Woodsen, a character in the TV series Gossip Girl, and in the 2007 film Interview.

Awards and exhibitions

In 2007, Weeks was nominated for the Cooper Hewitt National Design Award for the second time. In April 2006, he made his second appearance in the Metropolitan Home Design 100. In 2005, he was invited to judge I.D. Magazine’s Annual Design Review, and in 2004, he was one of seven designers chosen to represent New York at Berlin’s 7+7 Designmai exhibit. Weeks was featured in the 2003 Cooper-Hewitt’s National Design Triennial: Inside Design Now.

Weeks won Editor Awards at the 1999 and 2001 International Contemporary Furniture Fair. Butter's debut collection earned accolades including an award from Blueprint (architecture magazine) at London’s 100% Design Show, and featured the Lunette lampshade.

 2010 Nominee, Designpreis Deutschland
 2009 GOOD DESIGN Award, Hanno & Ursa Wooden Toys
 2008 GOOD DESIGN Award, Sculpt furniture & Sarus lighting collection
 2006 Metropolitan Home Design 100
 2005 Judge for I.D. Annual Design review
 2004 Metropolitan Home Design 100
 2001 Editors Award, ICFF, Lighting (as Butter)
 1999 Award Annual Design Review ID Magazine, Lunette
 1999 Editors Award, ICFF, Lighting

Publications
Weeks's work has been featured in such publications as Dwell, Architectural Digest, Interior Design, Harper’s Bazaar, Wallpaper*, W, I.D., and Elle Decor. His work has also been featured in the following books:

 Overs!ze: Mega Art & Installations, 2013 Victionary
 Toy Design, 2010 Braun Publishing
 Creative USA, 2008 daab books
 Ultimate New York Design, 2006 teNeues Vertag GmbH + Co. KG, Kemper
 Young Designers Americas, 2006 daab, Fusion Publishing
 Inside Design Now, 2003 Princeton Architectural Press

References

Additional sources
 A Country House, Cookie magazine, September 2008
 Workspace: David Weeks, Dunderdon Website, September 2008
 Designer Identikit, Azure Magazine, August 2008
A New Line of Upholstered Furniture, New York Times, March 20, 2008
Best in Show at WestWeek, Los Angeles Times, March 2008
Are Designers Sheathing the Cutting Edge?, New York Times, May 19, 2005
Personal shopper: Summertime, and the Lighting Is Breezy, New York Times, June 10, 2004
Currents: Trade Show; A Little Modern, At the Javits Center, New York Times, May 15, 2003
Q+A with David Weeks & Lindsay Adelman, I.D. (magazine)
Design notebook: Designers Find You Can't Live On Buzz, New York Times, September 21, 2000
Currents: Lighting; Good Company For Book Lovers To Greet the New Year, New York Times, December 23, 1999

External links
David Weeks Studio

Living people
1968 births
American furniture designers
Lighting brands